Sherzod Shakirov (born 18 October 1990) is a Kyrgyzstani international footballer who plays professionally for FC Kaganat, as a defender.

Career
In 2017, Sharikov signed for Georgian club FC Zugdidi.

Career statistics

International

Statistics accurate as of match played 20 November 2018

Honours
Neftchi Kochkor-Ata
Kyrgyzstan League (1); 2010

Alay Osh
Kyrgyzstan League (1); 2013
Kyrgyzstan Cup  (1): 2013

References

External links
 

1990 births
Living people
Kyrgyzstani footballers
Kyrgyzstan international footballers
FC Dordoi Bishkek players
Association football defenders
Kyrgyzstani people of Tajik descent
Al Hala SC players